Hercocyrtoceras is a middle Silurian oncocerid found in Nova Scotia and Quebec. Shells are depressed, irregularly annulated cyrtocones with V-shaped hyponomic sinuses, ornamented by longitudinal and transverse ridges. Position and structure of the siphuncle were unknown as of 1964.

Hercocyrtoceras is related to other acleisoceratid genera such as Acleistoceras, Amphycyrtoceras, and Ectocyrtoceras.

References
 Walter C Sweet, 1964.  Nautiloidea - Oncocerida.   Treatise on Invertebrate Paleontology. Part K  Geological Society of America and University of Kansas Press.

Oncocerida
Silurian cephalopods
Silurian cephalopods of North America